The Marion Star (formerly known as The Marion Daily Star) is a newspaper in Marion, Ohio.  The paper is owned by the Gannett Newspaper organization. The paper is also notable as having once been owned and published by Warren G. Harding (prior to his election as President of the United States), and his wife Florence Kling Harding.

History
Founded as the Daily Pebble, the format of the small daily grew and became The Marion Daily Star.  When Harding acquired the newspaper in the 1880s, for $300 with Johnny Sickel and Jack Warwick, it was struggling.  Not long after the joint purchase, Harding became sole owner&mdash;Sickel exiting first out of frustration with the available equipment, and Warwick leaving for work on a bigger city paper.  Harding apparently started editing at the newspaper right after he acquired it and continued to at least 1920.  The dubious financial position of The Marion Daily Star improved following the marriage of Harding to Florence Kling DeWolfe who promptly set about to straighten out the accounting, and increasing circulation.  American Civil Liberties Union founder and Socialist candidate for President Norman Thomas carried the Daily Star as a youngster growing up in Marion where his father was minister of the First Presbyterian Church.

Under Harding the newspaper's editorial position leaned toward the Republican Party platform, but remained somewhat neutral because of its position of the daily newspaper of record for Marion County.  However, Harding also launched The Marion Weekly Star – a once-a-week summary newspaper designed for mail delivery and rural circulation; this paper was unapologetically Republican in its editorials. The Weekly Star was published from the 1890s into the 1910s when it was discontinued.

The Hardings retained ownership in the paper until mid-1923 when they sold the business to Brush-Moore Newspapers. For a number of years, the paper was part of the Thompson Newspaper chain based in Canada, who acquired Brush-Moore Newspapers in 1967. Under their ownership, the name was briefly changed to The Star in an attempt to broaden the marketability of the paper beyond the Marion County region.  Again known as The Marion Star, the paper is owned and operated by Gannett, who purchased the paper from Thomson in 2000. Under Gannett, editorial, business offices and retail advertising are maintained in Marion, while printing and classified advertising operations have been moved to a regional press house in Mansfield, Ohio.

The Marion Ohio Public Library and The Ohio Historical Society maintain microfilm libraries of newspaper for public research; the paper is also accessible for a monthly subscription fee through www.ancestry.com and www.newspaperarchives.com.

Notable people
 Gary Abernathy
 Florence Harding
 Warren G. Harding
 Norman Thomas

References

External links

The Marion Star official website
Official mobile site

Newspapers published in Ohio
Marion County, Ohio
Gannett publications
Warren G. Harding
Marion, Ohio
Publications established in 1877
1877 establishments in Ohio